Pill or The Pill may refer to:

Drugs
 Pill (pharmacy), referring to anything small for a specific dose of medicine
 "The Pill", a general nickname for the combined oral contraceptive pill

Film and television
 The Pill (film), a 2011 film
 "The Pill", a 1999 episode of That '70s Show

Music
"The Pill" (song), a song by Loretta Lynn
The Pills, American rock band
 "The Pill", a song by The Brothers-in-Law
 "Pills", a song by Bo Diddley
 "Pills", a song by Joji from In Tongues
 "Pills", a song by The Mess Hall from Notes from a Ceiling
 "Pills", a song by St. Vincent from Masseduction

Places 
 Pil (placename) or Pill, a placename element of Welsh origin
 Pill, Tyrol, a municipality in Austria
 Pill, Somerset, a village in England, United Kingdom
 Pillgwenlly or Pill, an electoral ward in Newport, South Wales, United Kingdom
 Pill Priory, near Milford Haven in Pembrokeshire, Wales, United Kingdom

Other uses 
 Pill (surname), list of people with the surname
 Pill (rapper) (born 1986), American rapper
 Pill (textile), a small ball of fuzz on cloth, or the creation of such fuzz balls

See also
 Les Pilles, a commune in France